This is a list of members of the Victorian Legislative Council, as elected at the 2006 state election.

 Southern Metropolitan Labor MLC Evan Thornley resigned on 28 December 2008. Jennifer Huppert was appointed as his replacement on 3 February 2009.
 Northern Metropolitan Labor MLC Theo Theophanous resigned on 1 March 2010. Nathan Murphy was appointed as his replacement on 9 March 2010.

Members of the Parliament of Victoria by term
21st-century Australian politicians